The following lists events that happened during 1978 in Greece.

Incumbents
 President – Konstantinos Tsatsos
 Prime Minister – Konstantinos Karamanlis

Events

 20 June – The 6.2  Thessaloniki earthquake affected Central Macedonia with a maximum Mercalli intensity of VIII (Severe), causing 45–50 deaths and 100–220 injuries.

Births

 25 June – Virginia Karentzou, artistic gymnast

References

 
Years of the 20th century in Greece
Greece
1970s in Greece
Greece